BNA may refer to:
Bahrain News Agency, the state news agency of Bahrain
Bakhtar News Agency, the state news agency in Afghanistan
Basle Nomina Anatomica, the first revision of anatomic nomenclature
Burma National Army
British Naturalists' Association
British Neuroscience Association
British Newspaper Archive
British North America, a former name for Canada
British North America Acts, the original Constitutional Acts of Canada
Bureau of National Affairs, a U.S. commercial publisher
Banco de la Nación Argentina
BNA Records, a record label
Bridged nucleic acid
BNA: Brand New Animal, an anime television series
BNA, IATA airport code of Nashville International Airport
BNA, National Rail station code of Burnage railway station, Manchester, England
Banco Nacional de Angola